The mountain greenbul (Arizelocichla nigriceps), or eastern mountain greenbul, is a species of the bulbul family of passerine birds. It is found in eastern Africa.

Taxonomy and systematics
The mountain greenbul was originally described in the genus Xenocichla (a synonym for Bleda), then classified in Andropadus and, in 2010 re-classified to the new genus Arizelocichla. Alternatively, some authorities classify the mountain greenbul in the genus Pycnonotus. Some authorities also consider the olive-breasted greenbul to be a subspecies of the mountain greenbul, while others consider the mountain greenbul itself to be a subspecies of the western greenbul.  The common name, 'mountain greenbul', is also used as an alternate name for the western and Cameroon greenbuls.

References

mountain greenbul
Birds of Sub-Saharan Africa
Birds of East Africa
mountain greenbul
mountain greenbul
Taxonomy articles created by Polbot